Bohle or Böhle is a German surname, and may refer to:

Ernst Wilhelm Bohle (1903–1960), leader of the Foreign Organization of the German Nazi Party 
Hans-Georg Bohle (1948–2014), German geographer
Klaus Bohle (born 1936), German sprint canoer

See also
Bohle River, a river in Queensland, Australia
Böhler (surname)
Behle
Buhle